Candy Jacobs (born 12 June 1990) is a Dutch professional street skateboarder. She won the silver medal at the 2018 European Skateboarding Championships. She competed at the World Skateboarding Championships in 2018, 2019, and 2020, and at the X Games in 2011, 2012, 2013, 2016, 2018, and 2019.

She was scheduled to compete at the 2020 Summer Olympics, but had to withdraw due to a positive COVID-19 test while in Japan a few days before the opening ceremony.

Jacobs started skateboarding when she was 13 years old in highschool. She is the owner of a skatepark in Venlo that was opened in 2020. In January 2021, Jacobs underwent knee surgery for a torn meniscus and damaged cartilage after she had been struggling with knee issues for years.

References

External links
 Candy Jacobs at The Boardr
 
 
 

1990 births
Dutch skateboarders
Dutch sportswomen
Female skateboarders
Living people
People from Tegelen
Sportspeople from Limburg (Netherlands)
21st-century Dutch women